Northumberland National Park is the northernmost national park in England. The park lies entirely within Northumberland, covering about a quarter of the county.

The park covers several distinct areas. In the north are the Cheviot Hills, a range of hills that mark the border between England and Scotland. Further south, the hills give way to areas of rolling moorland, some of which have been covered by forestry plantations to form Kielder Forest. The southernmost part of the park covers the dramatic central section of Hadrian's Wall, dating from the Roman occupation.

The 10,000-year history of human habitation of the region is explored through the many archaeological sites, ranging from prehistoric monuments and Roman remains to Pele towers, constructed as a defence against invading Scots and Border Reivers.

The Park's official symbol is the curlew.

Etymology
The Northumberland National Park takes its name from the English county of Northumberland. Northumberland means "country north of the River Humber" and is related to the name "Northumbria", referring to the former Anglo-Saxon kingdom which once covered much of Northern England. The national park lies totally within the boundaries of Northumberland.

Geography
The Northumberland National Park covers a large area of Western Northumberland and borders the English county of Cumbria and the Scottish council area of The Scottish Borders. The national park encompasses much of the Cheviot Hills and adjoins the Southern Uplands of Scotland, which the hills are sometimes considered a part of.  Since the Pennine Way runs through the national park, the Cheviot Hills are also considered a part of the northern Pennines although they are separated from the Cheviot Hills by the Tyne Gap, part of which lies within the southern extent of the national park. Part of Kielder Forest lies within the park, and in other areas forms a forest park. Kielder Forest is the largest man-made forest in Europe and surrounds Kielder Water.

Otterburn Training Area
The Ministry of Defence in the United Kingdom owns much of the land in the national park as the Otterburn Training Area. Some parts of this training area are off-limits; others can be accessed only at certain times or with permission. The training area accounts for 23% of the Northumberland National Park.

Dark Sky Park status
In December 2013 the International Dark Sky Association conferred Dark Sky Park status on an area including Northumberland National Park and Kielder; it is the largest protected Dark Sky Park in Europe.

References

External links

 Homepage for Northumberland National Park Authority
 Homepage for Northumberland National Park Mountain Rescue Team

National parks in England
Parks and open spaces in Northumberland
Protected areas established in 1956